The Confessions of Frannie Langton is a four-part British period drama television series based on the novel by Sara Collins, adapted by Collins herself and produced by Drama Republic for ITV. It premiered on 8 December 2022 as part of the inaugural slate of dramas on the new ITVX streaming service. In the US, the series premiered on BritBox US on 8 March 2023. 

The television series has received positive reviews. Karina Adelgaard of Womentainment opined that despite having LGBTQ characters dying – known as the "bury your gays" trope – the "unapologetic" love story, paired with staying true to the time period, makes it work.

Cast

Main
 Karla-Simone Spence as Frannie Langton
 Keira Chansa as Teen Frannie
 Caelan Best as Young Frannie
 Sophie Cookson as Madame Marguerite Benham
 Stephen Campbell Moore as George Benham
 Patrick Martins as Olaudah "Laddie" Cambridge
 Pooky Quesnel as Linux
 Amarah-Jae St. Aubyn as Sal
 Henry Pettigrew as William Pettigrew
 Jodhi May as Hephzibah "Hep" Elliot
 Steven Mackintosh as John Langton

Supporting
 Lydia Page as Pru
 Mina Andala as Phibba
 James Alexandrou as Constable Meek
 Lou Broadbent as Miss Bella Langton
 Lauren Conroy as Martha
 T'Shan Williams as Calliope
 Martin Fisher as Sir Percy Benham

Production

Development
It was announced in August 2020 that ITV had commissioned an adaptation of Collins' novel, marking ITV's first commission from Drama Republic. Collins herself would adapt and executive produce the work alongside Greg Brenman and Rebecca de Souza also executive producing and Carol Harding producing. Andrea Harkin would direct the drama.

Casting
In August 2021, it was announced Karla-Simone Spence, Sophie Cookson, and Patrick Martins would star in the series with Spence taking the titular role. Stephen Campbell Moore, Steven Mackintosh, and Henry Pettigrew had also joined the cast.

Filming
Receiving support from Screen Yorkshire and Production Intelligence, principal photography took place across Yorkshire, beginning in August 2021 and wrapping in November. Markéta Korinkova designed the sets for the series. Filming locations included Wakefield, Mansion House on St Helen's Square and the former post office on Lendal in York, Sledmere House, Kingston upon Hull, and Versa Studios in Leeds.

References

External links

2022 British television series debuts
2022 British television series endings
2020s British drama television series
2020s British LGBT-related drama television series
2020s British television miniseries
2020s drama television series
ITV miniseries
ITV television dramas
Lesbian-related television shows
Television series set in the 19th century
Television shows based on British novels
Television shows set in Jamaica